Limiting Factor is a crewed deep-submergence vehicle (DSV) manufactured by Triton Submarines and owned and operated by Gabe Newell’s Inkfish ocean-exploration research organisation. It currently holds the records for the deepest crewed dives in all five oceans. 
Limiting Factor was commissioned by Victor Vescovo for $37 million. It is commercially certified by DNV for dives to full ocean depth, and is operated by a pilot, with facilities for an observer.

The vessel was used in the Five Deeps Expedition, becoming the first crewed submersible to reach the deepest point in all five oceans. Over 21 people have visited Challenger Deep, the deepest area on Earth, in the DSV.

Limiting Factor was used to identify the wrecks of the destroyers USS Johnston at a depth of 6,469 m, and the USS Samuel B. Roberts at 6,865  m, in the Philippine Trench, the deepest dives on wrecks. It has also been used for dives to the French submarine Minerve (S647) at about 2,350 m (7,710 ft) in the Mediterranean sea, and has visited the Titanic.

Design and construction
The submersible is based on a spherical titanium pressure hull for two occupants, seated side by side, which has three wide angle acrylic viewports in front of the crew, one in front of each seat, and one below and between then.

The vessel is equipped with a manipulator arm on the starboard side of the pressure hull, a system to drop ballast, and a cluster of five, fixed direction, ducted propeller, marine thrusters at each of the port and starboard ends of the outer hull for propulsion and maneuvering, as can be seen in the photographs. These thrusters provide three axis translational motion and two axis (yaw and roll) rotation.

The vessel is commercially certified for unlimited full ocean depth operations by DNV GL

The Limiting Factor normally operates from a dedicated support vessel, the DSSV Pressure Drop (ex USNS Indomitable), but can also be operated from other suitably equipped vessels.

Specifications

Operational limits
The designed operational maximum dive depth of 11,000 m represents approximate full ocean depth. Test pressure of  14,000 msw provides a safety margin. The vessel has been certified to a preliminary maximum diving depth of 10925 +-6.5 m by DNV, based on data from the deepest dive. The vessel is commercially rated for repeated dives to full ocean depth.

Principal dimensions
The vessel is unusual in that it can travel on three primary axes, and in practice does a large amount of traveling vertically. If one uses the direction in which the occupants look out on the surroundings through physical windows to define the bow, it is wider than it is long. Alternatively it may be considered to have a bow at either end of the long axis, depending on the direction of motion at the time, like a proa. The long horizontal axis is 4,600 m (15 ft), while the short horizontal axis extent is only 1,900 m. (9.2 ft). The height is 3,700 m. (12.2 ft)

Masses, weights and volumes
Mass = 12500kg
Dry weight = 11,700 kg
Variable ballast = up to 500 kg dive weights, and 100 kg trim weights
Payload = approximately 220 kg
The vessel is operated by a pilot, and has seating for an observer

Buoyancy
Surface ballast = 2150 litres
Syntactic foam buoyancy is used

Structure
The pressure hull is a 1500 mm inside diameter by 90 mm thick grade 23 titanium (Ti-6Al-4V ELI) alloy sphere machined to within 99.933% of spherical (for enhanced buckling stability). The structure is certified for repeated dives to full ocean depth. The hydrodynamic fairing of the outer surface shell is non-structural and removable for access to equipment.

Performance
Endurance = 96 hours +106 hours on emergency systems
Speed = 1 to 2 knots vertical, 2 to 3 knots lateral
Hull form configuration has been optimized for vertical travel, as much of the traveling time will be spent ascending and descending through the water column

Power
The vessel operated from a dual 24V battery power supply and emergency supply, which can be jettisoned in an emergency. The main battery stores 65 kWh.

Propulsion
There are 4 x 5.5 kW horizontal propulsion thrusters (main thrusters), 4 x 5.5 kW vertical thrusters, and 2 x 5.5 kW maneuvering thrusters, mounted in two clusters at the opposite extremes of the long dimension. These can each be jettisoned if they become fouled on an obstruction, allowing the vessel to break free in an emergency.

Manipulator
The DSV is fitted with a single Kraft Telerobotics "Raptor" hydraulically powered 7-function manipulator with force feedback, at the starboard side of the pressure hull.

Ergonomics, safety, and life support

The forward and downward view through the three ultra-wide angle acrylic viewports is unobstructed by structure or appendages, and illuminated by ten externally mounted high output LED lighting panels pf 20,000 lumens each. The limited direct field of view through the ports is augmented by an array of four full ocean depth capable low-light cameras. Four high definition cameras are also provided to record missions.

Maneuvering is by control joystick, touch screen and manual override.

The cabin is temperature and humidity controlled, and the Life support system uses carbon dioxide scrubbers and oxygen replenishment. Emergency life support  is rated for 96 hours
All routine maintenance can be done using standard tools
Emergency release systems are provided for the batteries, so they can be jettisoned if they fail dangerously, and for the thrusters and manipulator arm, in case they get snagged on an obstacle which could prevent the vessel from surfacing.

Deployment and recovery
Launch and recovery from DSSV Pressure Drop is by a hydraulic luffing (tilting) A-frame over the transom. The vessel is stowed on deck in a cradle.

Name

In Iain M. Banks' novel The Player of Games, the General Offensive Unit (demilitarised) Limiting Factor is the sapient warship provided to the main character Jernau Morat Gurgeh for transport to Empire of Azad to take part in a board game tournament. It is nominally demilitarised, but retains part of its main armament.

Expeditions

Five Deeps Expedition

In 2018, Victor Vescovo launched the Five Deeps Expedition, with the objective of visiting the deepest points of all five of the world's oceans, and mapping the vicinity, by the end of September 2019. This expedition was filmed in the documentary television series Expedition Deep Ocean. This objective was achieved one month ahead of schedule, and the expedition's team carried out biological samplings and depth confirmations at each location. Besides the deepest points of the five world oceans, the expedition also made dives in the Horizon Deep and the Sirena Deep, and mapped the Diamantina Fracture Zone.

On 4 February 2019, Vescovo piloted Limiting Factor to the bottom of the South Sandwich Trench, the deepest part of the Southern Ocean, becoming the first perso and first vessel to reach that point. In preparation for this dive, the expedition used a Kongsberg EM124 multibeam sonar system for accurate mapping of the trench.

On 16 April 2019, Vescovo piloted Limiting Factor to the bottom of the Sunda Trench south of Bali, Indonesia, reaching the deepest point of the Indian Ocean. The team reported sightings of what they believed to be species new to science, including a hadal snailfish and a gelatinous organism believed to be a stalked ascidian. The same dive was later undertaken by Patrick Lahey, President of Triton Submarines, and the expedition's chief scientist, Dr. Alan Jamieson. This dive was organised subsequent to the scanning of the Diamantina Fracture Zone using multibeam sonar, confirming that the Sunda Trench was deeper and settling the debate about where the deepest point in the Indian Ocean is.

Diving for a second time on 1 May, he became the first person to dive the Challenger Deep twice, finding "at least three new species of marine animals" and "some sort of plastic waste".

On 7 May 2019, Vescovo and Jamieson, in Limiting Factor, made the first human-occupied deep submersible dive to the bottom of the Sirena Deep, the third deepest point in the ocean, about 128 miles northeast of Challenger Deep. They spent 176 minutes at the bottom, and among the samples they retrieved was a piece of mantle rock from the western slope of the Mariana Trench.

In doing so, Vescovo and Limiting Factor had descended to the first, second, and third deepest points in the ocean. Unlike the Sunda and Mariana Trenches, no signs of human contamination were found at Horizon Deep, which was described by the expedition as "completely pristine".

USS Johnston

USS Johnston (DD-557) was a  built for the United States Navy during World War II. On 25 October 1944, while assigned as part of the escort to six escort carriers, Johnston, two other Fletcher-class destroyers, and four destroyer escorts were engaged by a large Imperial Japanese Navy flotilla. In what became known as the Battle off Samar, Johnston and the other escort ships charged the Japanese ships to protect nearby US carriers and transport craft. After engaging several Japanese capital ships and a destroyer squadron, Johnston was sunk by gunfire, with 187 dead. The wreck was discovered on 30 October 2019 but was not properly identified until March 2021.

The remains consisted of a deck gun, a propeller shaft, and some miscellaneous debris that could not be used to identify the wreck, but additional debris was observed lying deeper than the ship's ROV could go. On 31 March 2021, the Limiting Factor piloted by Victor Vescovo, surveyed and photographed the deeper wreckage and definitively identified it as Johnston. Until Samuel B. Roberts was discovered on 22 June 2022, Johnston was the deepest identified shipwreck in the world.

USS Samuel B. Roberts

USS Samuel B. Roberts (DE-413) was a  destroyer escort of the United States Navy that served in World War II and was sunk in the Battle off Samar, in which a small force of U.S. warships prevented a superior Imperial Japanese Navy force from attacking the amphibious invasion fleet off the Philippine island of Leyte. The ship was part of a relatively light flotilla of destroyers, destroyer escorts, and escort carriers called "Taffy 3" which was inadvertently left to fend off a fleet of heavily armed Japanese battleships, cruisers, and destroyers off the island of Samar during the Battle off Samar, one of the engagements making up the larger Battle of Leyte Gulf of October 1944. Steaming through incoming shells, Samuel B. Roberts scored one torpedo hit and several shell hits on larger enemy warships before she was sunk. As of June 2022, it is the deepest shipwreck discovered.

An exploration team led by Victor Vescovo and made up of personnel of Caladan Oceanic and EYOS Expeditions discovered the wreck of Samuel B. Roberts in June 2022. The team found, identified, and surveyed the wreck during a series of six dives from 17 to 24 June 2022. They reported that they had found evidence of damage to the ship inflicted by a Japanese battleship shell, including the vessel's fallen mast.

French submarine Minerve

The French Daphne class diesel–electric submarine Minerve  was lost with all hands in bad weather while returning to her home port of Toulon in January 1968.

The location of the wreck was found on 21 July 2019 by the company Ocean Infinity using the search ship . Although Minerves sail was damaged, it was possible to positively identify the wreckage. as the letters "MINE" and "S" (from Minerve and S647, respectively) were still readable on the hull.

In December 2019, Vescovo proposed a dive on the wreck of the Minerve in the Limiting Factor. On the first dive, 1 February 2020, Vescovo dived with retired French Rear Admiral Jean-Louis Barbier, to gather new information on the cause of the loss.
On the second dive, 2 February, Vescovo piloted while Hervé Fauve, the son of the submarine's commanding officer, sat in the second seat. At the bottom they placed a granite memorial plaque on a section of Minerves hull at a depth of over

Gallery

See also

References

Bibliography

Citations

External links

 

Deep-submergence vehicles